Quick Fix Meals with Robin Miller is an American television program on the Food Network hosted by Robin Miller.

Robin Miller who is a food writer and nutritionist, offers recipes and techniques specifically healthy meals, to fit a busy lifestyle, with no time to spare. Miller guides viewers on getting food on the table every night, with the planning strategies she offers on the show. On each episode she offers a shopping list so you can visit the supermarket once, and get the meal done right and quick.

References

External links
 Quick Fix Meals with Robin Miller on FoodTV.com

Food Network original programming
2000s American cooking television series
2005 American television series debuts
2008 American television series endings